Jim Evenson (born January 9, 1947) was a running back who played seven seasons in the Canadian Football League for the British Columbia Lions and the Ottawa Rough Riders. Evenson won the Eddie James Memorial Trophy in 1971. He was a part of the Rough Riders 1973 Grey Cup winning team. Evenson played college football at University of Oregon. He finished his career with a brief stint with the Portland Thunder of the up-start WFL, where he rushed for 439 yards on 99 carries scoring one touchdown. Evenson also caught 18 passes for 108 yards. Evenson died in January, 2008 at the age of 61.

References 
2. Web.archive.org. (2018). More bricks for the Wall of Fame. [online] Available at: https://web.archive.org/web/20121109132253/http://www.canada.com/theprovince/news/story.html?id=35a31e6c-1b84-4922-aed5-0a8ed5754d02 [Accessed 8 Oct. 2018].

1947 births
Living people
BC Lions players
Canadian football running backs
Oregon Ducks football players
Ottawa Rough Riders players
Players of American football from Oregon
Portland Thunder (WFL) players
Sportspeople from Hillsboro, Oregon